Aimé Steven Nsimba Labe (born 31 May 1996) is a French professional footballer who plays as a striker for Laval.

Career
Nsimba began his senior career with Paris 13 Atletico in 2017, and shortly after moved to Bobigny where he had a stint. He transferred to Les Ulis in 2021, where he played for 2 and a half seasons. He spent the 2021-22 season with Bourges, where he was one of the top scorers with 16 goals in 30 games. This earned him a move to newly promoted Ligue 2 side Laval on 20 June 2022. In September 2022, he sufferred a knee injury that rules him out for several months.

Personal life
Born in France, Nsimba is of DR Congolese descent.

References

External links
 

1996 births
Living people
Sportspeople from Ivry-sur-Seine
French footballers
French sportspeople of Democratic Republic of the Congo descent
Paris 13 Atletico players
Football Club 93 Bobigny-Bagnolet-Gagny players
CO Les Ulis players
Bourges Foot 18 players
Stade Lavallois players
Ligue 2 players
Championnat National 2 players
Championnat National 3 players
Association football forwards